The Shire of East Pilbara is one of the four local government areas in the Pilbara region of Western Australia. The Shire's seat of government, and home to nearly half the Shire's population, is the town of Newman in the shire's south-west.

History

The Shire of East Pilbara was established on 27 May 1972 with the amalgamation of the Shire of Marble Bar and the Shire of Nullagine. The Shire offices and administration centre previously resided in the Town of Marble Bar, but in 1987 was moved to Newman after BHP ceded the town (formerly a closed town) to the Shire.

Wards
The Shire is divided into six wards, having a total of eleven Councillors and one Shire President:

 South Ward
 North
 North West
 Central
 Lower Central
 East

Towns and localities
The towns and localities of the Shire of East Pilbara with population and size figures based on the most recent Australian census:

(* indicates locality is only partially located within this shire)

Former towns
Former towns in the Shire of East Pilbara:
 Bamboo Creek
 Goldsworthy
 Shay Gap

Heritage-listed places

As of 2023, 97 places are heritage-listed in the Shire of East Pilbara, of which seven are on the State Register of Heritage Places, among them Corunna Downs Station, Corunna Downs Airfield and the Ironclad Hotel.

References

External links
 

 
East Pilbara